John Ryan was a Welsh rugby union coach. Following success as a coach with Newport RFC and Cardiff RFC he was Head Coach of the Wales national rugby union team from 1988 to 1990. At the time he was the first Wales coach to have not played for the national team.

References

External links
Wales profile

1939 births
2022 deaths
Newport HSOB RFC players
Wales national rugby union team coaches
Welsh rugby union coaches
Newport RFC players
London Welsh RFC players
Welsh rugby union players
People educated at Newport High School
Alumni of the University of Nottingham
Middlesex County RFU players